Mathias Dyngeland (born 7 October 1995) is a Norwegian footballer who plays as a goalkeeper for Brann in 1. divisjon. He has previously played for Fana and Sogndal.

Dyngeland has played national team football for age-old national teams, the first 10 February 2012, when he played for Norway's U17 team. [3] 30. In May 2017 he was taken out in his first national team for Norway in the fight against the Czech Republic (10 June) and Sweden (13 June). [4]

Career
Dyngeland was born in Fana and he started his career with Fana.

Dyngeland joined Sogndal in 2012. He made his debut for Sogndal in a 3-0 defeat against Stabæk.

Career statistics

Club

References 

1995 births
Living people
Footballers from Bergen
Norwegian footballers
Fana IL players
Sogndal Fotball players
Eliteserien players
Norwegian First Division players
Association football goalkeepers